The Unmaking of a College is a 2022 documentary film. The film covers the planned closure of Hampshire College and the subsequent movement by students, alumni, and professors that ultimately saved the school.

References

External links
 https://imdb.com/title/tt15156954/

2022 documentary films
2022 films
2020s English-language films